Madeline Musselman (born June 16, 1998) is an American water polo player. Maddie was named Woman's water polo MVP after her USA Team won gold in Tokyo at the 2020ne Summer Olympics.  She was one of the highest leading scorers with 18 goals.  It is the fourth time in her career that she has been named the MVP of a major international tournament as she was named the MVP of the FINA World League Super Final in 2019 and again in 2021. She was also named the MVP of the FINA World Championships in 2017 where Team USA won gold; scored 16 goals in six games, including hat trick in 13–6 final-round win over Spain. Additionally, the three-time First-Team All-American, at UCLA, was also named the 2021 Women's Total Player of the Year by (Total Waterpolo).  

Maddie was also part of the gold medal-winning American team at the 2016 Summer Olympics. She was the second-leading goal scorer of the US team in the event with 12 goals and named to the Olympic All-Star Team.

Musselman won gold with Team USA at the 2015 FINA World Championships in Kazan, Russia, and at the Pan American Games in Toronto.

She was named 2017 Mountain Pacific Sports Federation Newcomer of the Year after she won a conference-record seven Newcomer of the Week awards.

Personal life
Musselman is the daughter of former Major League Baseball pitcher Jeff Musselman.

See also
 United States women's Olympic water polo team records and statistics
 List of Olympic champions in women's water polo
 List of Olympic medalists in water polo (women)
 List of world champions in women's water polo
 List of World Aquatics Championships medalists in water polo

References

External links
 
 Maddie Musselman – National Team water polo profile at USAwaterpolo.org
 Maddie Musselman – UCLA athlete profile at UCLAbruins.com
 
 

1998 births
Living people
Sportspeople from Newport Beach, California
American female water polo players
Water polo drivers
Water polo players at the 2016 Summer Olympics
Medalists at the 2016 Summer Olympics
Olympic gold medalists for the United States in water polo
World Aquatics Championships medalists in water polo
Water polo players at the 2015 Pan American Games
Water polo players at the 2019 Pan American Games
Pan American Games medalists in water polo
Pan American Games gold medalists for the United States
Medalists at the 2015 Pan American Games
Water polo players at the 2020 Summer Olympics
UCLA Bruins women's water polo players
Medalists at the 2020 Summer Olympics